Elsa Marion Redmond is an American archaeologist at the American Museum of Natural History. She specialises in Latin American archaeology. She is an elected a member of the National Academy of Sciences and the American Academy of Arts and Sciences.

Early life and education 
Redmond was born Caracas and grew up in Venezuela. She attended the Madeira School. Her father, W. Parker Redmond, had studied at Rice University. She studied at Vassar College, before transferring to Rice University for her undergraduate studies, and eventually earned a bachelor's degree in 1973. During her undergraduate studies Redmond completed a summer placement mapping Monte Albán with Richard Blanton. She was a graduate student at Yale University, where she earned a master's degree and PhD in 1981. During her postgraduate studies, Redmond began researching the formation and evolution of societies in the Oaxaca Valley and Venezuela. Her doctorate considered the hypothesis proposed in inscriptions at Monte Albán, which indicate that the Zapotec people conquered the CuicatlCa.

Research and career 
Redmond was appointed to the University of Connecticut in 1981. She has investigated the role of warfare in the emergence of centralised, hierarchical societies, as well as the role of conquest warfare in the formation of the Zapotec civilization. She began to work on the Oaxaca Valley with Charles S. Spencer. During her fieldwork, Redmond has encountered Africanized bees, venomous snakes and quicksand. The early history of people who lived in Mexico is difficult to reconstruct as they did not use written documentation. The majority of our history relies on accounts given by Spanish explorers. It was unclear when the Zapotec people had become a political entity with bureaucracy, rather than existing in a series of independent chiefdoms. It was well documented that the Zapotec waged wars with the neighbours. Spencer and Redmond were the first to excavate many of the buildings in the Oaxaca Valley.

In 1991 she joined the American Museum of Natural History. At the American Museum of Natural History Redmond is Curator of the Division of Anthropology. She has investigated the town of San Martín Tilcajete, mapping the land, excavating mounds and public buildings. On El Palenque, an overgrown hillside site, Redmond discovered a complex of stone foundations with indications of houses. She led a team of graduate students in excavating the site. In 2017 Redmond uncovered a palatial compound in El Palenque's plaza in Oaxaca Valley. Redmond used radiocarbon dating to identify the age of the palace complex. The palace, which is similar to others in the Mesoamerican states, is between 2,100 and 2,300 years old. Redmond argued that it may be evidence of one of the earliest American governments.

Awards and honours 
Her awards and honours include;

2007 Elected to the American Academy of Arts and Sciences
 2014 Elected to the National Academy of Sciences

Books

Personal life 
Redmond is married to Charles S. Spencer.

References 

Year of birth missing (living people)
Living people
Venezuelan emigrants to the United States
American archaeologists
American women archaeologists
People associated with the American Museum of Natural History
Mesoamerican archaeologists
Rice University alumni
Yale University alumni
People from Caracas
University of Connecticut faculty
Madeira School alumni
Fellows of the American Academy of Arts and Sciences
Members of the United States National Academy of Sciences
American women academics
21st-century American women